The Punta Maria Cristina is a mountain (3,706 m) of the Pennine Alps, located on the Swiss-Italian border. It lies on the main Alpine watershed, between the Dent d'Hérens and the Matterhorn.

On the summit is the permanent bivouac shelter named , dedicated in 1983 to the Novella Brothers from Vercelli, who both died while mountain-climbing.

References

Mountains of the Alps
Alpine three-thousanders
Mountains of Italy
Italy–Switzerland border
International mountains of Europe
Mountains of Valais
Mountains of Switzerland